was a 19th-century Japanese scholar of Rangaku and also a doctor. Today he is known as a "father of chemistry in Japan" thanks to his works.

Based on his specialized knowledge, he test-manufactured sugar, match, and daguerreotype, which contributed to the development of technology in Japan. He is assumed to have brewed beer for the first time in Japan. He is also noted as the first person to have used the word  or chemistry, which is now widely used in Japan.

Biography 
Kawamoto Komin was born in Sanda Domain (now Sanda, Hyogo) in 1810.

He started his education at the school of Sanda Domain at the age of 10 (in East Asian age reckoning).
In 1827, he studied Kampo medicine at  Village (now Kato, Hyogo) for about a year.

Two years later in 1829, having been attracted by Kawamoto's talent,  ,the lord of Sanda Domain, had him study Western medicine in Edo (now Tokyo).

In the next year, however, having committed a case of injury, he was forced to be under house arrest for six years.
After the house arrest, he was caught in a fire twice. It was literally his dark days.

In contrast, he had kept achieving great works in science and technology since late 1840s. According to his essay , he test-manufactured white phosphorus match in 1848.
In 1861, he published his famous , which introduced modern chemistry in the West in those days. It is considered as one of the most important literatures on chemistry in Edo period, as well as  written by Udagawa Yōan. It was used as a textbook in Bansho Shirabesho.

In 1868, he went back to his hometown Sanda and opened , a private school. The school soon became very popular and even a branch school was opened. Later, his son  was appointed to Dajō-kan, and he went up to Tokyo again accompanying his son.
On June 1, 1871, he died in Tokyo at the age of 62.

After his death 
In 1953, a monument was built in front of Sanda Elementary School in Sanda City in honor of Kawamoto.

In 2010, to commemorate the 200th anniversary of Kawamoto's birth,  brewed beer with the manufacturing process in those days, referring to his translation, and the product has been on sale.

Major works

Kikai Kanran Kogi 
 was first published in 1851. The book consists of five volumes.

Ensei Kiki Jutsu 
 was published in 1854, a manual on many kinds of machinery and instruments such as steamship, daguerreotype, and telegraph.

Kagaku Shinsho  
 was published in 1861. He translated the Dutch translation of "Die Schule der Chemie" written by Julius Adolph Stöckhardt, a German scientist. In the book, he used the word  or chemistry for the first time instead of the word , which was more popular at the time.

Kagaku Shinsho consists of fifteen volumes and two sections: inorganic chemistry and organic chemistry. It was not printed, and its manuscripts were used as textbooks at Bansho Shirabesho, where Komin was working as a professor. In Meiji Era he integrated it with other books on chemistry and published Kagaku Tsū (化学通).

It is now considered to be one of the most prominent books on chemistry in late Edo period as well as Seimi Kaisō (舎密開宗) written by Udagawa Yōan. Compared to Seimi Kaisō the latest concepts at the time like atom, molecule, chemical compounds and chemical equation were explained in it.

The inorganic chemistry section contains detailed specifics on chemical elements and chemical compounds. It covers various elements and compounds of acids (e.g. sulfuric acid, hydrochloric acid), light metals (e.g. sodium, potassium) and heavy metals (e.g.manganese, cobalt, lead). Komin assigned Kanji to each element as an element symbol e.g. "水", "炭", "窒" and "酸", which indicate hydrogen, carbon, nitrogen and oxygen for each. With this style of element symbol, for example, nitrogen dioxide (NO2) was expressed like this: "窒酸二", where "二" means two in Japanese. In the explanation of chemical compounds, the concept of formation of molecules with bonding was described with figures, in which John Dalton's atomic theory was first introduced to Japan.。

In organic chemistry section, it was explained that plant component consists of four kinds of elements i.e. hydrogen, carbon, nitrogen and oxygen. The concept of isomers was explained with molecular formula. It also contains the latest knowledge at that time on organic chemistry e.g. protein, acetyl group, aldehyde and radical. In addition brewing of alcoholic drink was explained in detail. Komin is assumed to have brewed beer based on the knowledge gained through this.

Notes

References

Sources

External links 
 
 

1810 births
1871 deaths
19th-century Japanese chemists
Rangaku
People from Hyōgo Prefecture
19th-century Japanese physicians
Date of birth missing